Jean Le Pelletier ( – ) was a French polygraph and alchemist.

Biography 

Le Pelletier was a merchant and a judge-consul in Rouen, but he was interested consecutively in painting, pedagogy, modern language, mathematics, architecture, astronomy, medicine and economy.

He was the author of several books on alchemistry and translated in French George Starkey's Pyrotechny asserted and illustrated. He wrote an Essay on Noah's ark.

Le Pelletier died in Rouen in 1711.

Quotation
Jean Le Pelletier is quoted by Gaston Bachelard in his book The Formation of the Scientific Mind (La formation de l'esprit scientifique).

Works

 Translation in French of Gregorio Leti's Historia, e memorie recondite sopra alla vita de Oliviero Cromvele: detto il tiranno senza vizi, il prencipe senza virtù.
 Translation in French of Gregorio Leti's Historia o vero vita di Elisabetta, regina d'Inghilterra: Detta per soprannome la Commediante Politica.
 Dissertations sur l'arche de Noé et sur l'hémine et la livre de S. Benoist.

References

1633 births
1711 deaths
French alchemists
17th-century alchemists
18th-century alchemists